Uşak Üniversitesi Sport Hall is an indoor arena that is a multi-purpose sports venue. It is located in the Uşak University, in Uşak, Turkey. The main hall has a seating capacity of 2,000 spectators.

History
The arena was opened in 2014. It is the home arena of Uşak Sportif, which currently plays in the Turkish Super League.

References

Sports venues completed in 2014
Indoor arenas in Turkey
Basketball venues in Turkey
2014 establishments in Turkey